The 1965 Claxton Shield was the 26th annual Claxton Shield, it was held in Sydney. The participants were South Australia, New South Wales, Victoria, Western Australia and Queensland. Victoria won their 8th Claxton Shield title in poor weather conditions similar to that of the 1964 Shield.

References

Claxton Shield
Claxton Shield
Claxton Shield
July 1965 sports events in Australia
August 1965 sports events in Australia